Saint Fachanan (also known as Fachtna), about whom very little is known with certainty, is linked by a strong early tradition with Kilfenora, where he founded a church or monastery in the sixth century. He is venerated as the first Bishop of Kilfenora. In the Roman Catholic Church, this diocese is now administered by the Diocese of Galway and in the Anglican church by the Diocese of Limerick and Killaloe.

His feast day is 20 December.

Saint Fachtna of Ross (feast day: formerly 14 August, now 13 August) was also called Fachanan.

He belonged to the ancient princely race of the Corcu Loígde.

External links
Saint Fachanan at Patron Saints Index

6th-century Christian saints
6th-century Irish bishops
People from County Clare
Medieval Irish saints